may refer to:

 Kusanagi, a legendary Japanese sword and one of three Imperial Regalia of Japan.
 , a class of destroyers of the Imperial Japanese Navy
 , three destroyers of the Imperial Japanese Navy and the Japanese Maritime Self-Defense Force
 Murakumo: Renegade Mech Pursuit, a video game